Lugus was a deity of the Celtic pantheon. His name is rarely directly attested in inscriptions, but his importance can be inferred from place names and ethnonyms. His nature and attributes are deduced from the distinctive iconography of Gallo-Roman inscriptions to Mercury, who is widely believed to have been identified with Lugus, and from the quasi-mythological narratives involving his later cognates, Welsh Lleu Llaw Gyffes (Lleu of the Skillful Hand) and Irish Lugh Lámhfhada (Lugh of the Long Arm).

Name

Etymology 
The etymology of the name is debated. Besides the Gaulish Lugos (pl. Lugoues, Lugouibus), the deity is attested in Old Irish Lug (Ogham: Lugu-), Middle Welsh Llew, and Celtiberian Luguei, which may point to a Common Celtic origin of the cult. A Proto-Celtic compound *Lugu-deks ('serving the god Lugus') can also be reconstructed from Gaulish Lugudeca, Old Irish Lugaid, and Hispano-Celtic Luguadici. The Lugunae, goddesses attested to in Atapuerca (Burgos), are also linguistically related.

It was once thought that the root may be derived from Proto-Indo-European  ('to shine'), but there are difficulties with this etymology and few modern scholars accept it as being possible (notably because Proto-Indo-European  never produces Proto-Celtic ).

According to linguist Xavier Delamarre, "it is not certain that there is an appellative behind this theonym; it is likely, given its presumed antiquity, that it is an unmotivated idionym (or that is has become so), possibly subject to various 'folk etymologies', one of the best known being Lugdunum = 'desideratum montem' from the Vienna glossary."

Related terms 
The theonym Lugu- was often used in proper names. It is the source of the place names Lugu-dunon ('Lugus' fortress'), at the origin of Lyon, Loudon, Laudun, Laon, and perhaps Leiden; *Lugu-ialon ('Lugus' village'), at the origin of Ligueil; as well as Lugu-ualion ('Place of Lugus-Sovereign'), the ancient name of Carlisle. It is also possible that Lucus Augusti (modern Lugo in Galicia, Spain) is derived from the theonym Lugus, although a derivation from Latin lucus ('grove') cannot be ruled out either.

It is also included in the personal names Lugu-dunolus, Lugu-uec[ca], Lugius, Lugissius, Lugu-rix, and Lugiola. The female name Lugu-selua, meaning 'Lugus' possession', can be compared with the Greek personal name Theodulus ('God's slave'). In Insular Celtic are found the Brythonic Louocatus (< *Lugu-catus) and Old Welsh Loumarch (< *Lugu-marcos 'Lugus' stallion').

Ethnonyms which may derive from Lugus include the Luggoni (or Lougonoi) of Asturias, as well as the Lougei, known from inscriptions in Lugo and El Bierzo. The Lougoi of Scotland might also be related.

Inscriptions

The god Lugus is mentioned in a Celtiberian inscription from Peñalba de Villastar in Spain, which reads:

ENI OROSEI VTA TICINO TIATVNEI TRECAIAS TO LVGVEI ARAIANOM COMEIMV ENI OROSEI EQVEISVIQVE OGRIS OLOCAS TOGIAS SISTAT LVGVEI TIASO TOGIAS

The exact interpretation of the inscription is debated, but the phrase "to Luguei" (where the theonym appears in the dative singular following the preposition to "to, for", thus "to/for Lugus") clearly indicates a dedication to the god Lugus.

Additionally, the name is attested several times in the plural, for example: nominative plural Lugoues in a single-word (and potentially Gaulish) inscription from Avenches, Switzerland, on the capital of a Corinthian column, and dative plural in a well-known Latin inscription from Uxama (Osma), Spain:

Lugovibus sacrum L. L(icinius) Urcico collegio sutorum d(onum) d(at)

"Lucius Licinius Urcico dedicated this, sacred to the Lugoves, to the guild of shoemakers"

[Scholars have long noted the interesting parallel between Lugus being worshiped by shoemakers in Spain and his Welsh counterpart Lleu being represented as a shoemaker in the 4th branch of the Mabinogi.]

The plural form of the theonym is also found in the following Latin inscriptions:

Lugo, Galicia, Spain:
Luc(obo) Gudarovis Vale[r(ius)] Cle.[m](ens) v(otum) l(ibens) s(olvit)

Outeiro de Rei, Lugo, Galicia, Spain:
Lucoubu Arquieni(s) Silonius Silo ex voto

Sober, Lugo, Galicia, Spain:
Lucubo Arquienob(o) C(aius) Iulius Hispanus v(otum) l(ibens) s(olvit) m(erito)

[Both epithets Arquieni and Arquienobo are considered to be related to a Proto-Indo-European root *h₂érkʷo 'bow, arrow'. Its cognates are found in Latin arcus and Modern English arrow.]

Nemausus (Nîmes), France:
Rufina Lucubus v(otum) s(olvit) l(ibens) m(erito)
The majority of the known inscriptions dedicated to Lugus come from the Iberian Peninsula, perhaps indicating this deity's particular importance and popularity among the Iberian Celts.

An inscribed lead plate found in Chamalières in France includes the phrase luge dessummiíis, which has been tentatively interpreted by some scholars as "I prepare them for Lugus", though it may also mean "I swear (luge) with/by my right (hand)".

Gaulish Mercury
Julius Caesar in his De Bello Gallico identified six gods worshipped in Gaul, by the usual conventions of interpretatio romana giving the names of their nearest Roman equivalents rather than their Gaulish names. He said that "Mercury" was the god most revered in Gaul, describing him as patron of trade and commerce, protector of travellers, and the inventor of all the arts. The Irish god Lug bore the epithet samildánach ("skilled in all arts"), which has led to the widespread identification of Caesar's Mercury as Lugus. Mercury's importance is supported by the more than 400 inscriptions referencing him in Roman Gaul and Britain. Such a blanket identification is optimistic; Jan de Vries demonstrates the unreliability of any one-to-one concordance in the interpretatio romana.

Iconography
The iconography of Gaulish Mercury includes birds, particularly ravens and the cock, now the emblem of France; horses; the tree of life; dogs or wolves; a caduceus, or herald's staff topped with a pair of snakes; mistletoe; shoes (one of the dedications to the Lugoves was made by a shoemakers' guild; Lugus's Welsh counterpart Lleu (or Llew) Llaw Gyffes is described in the Welsh Triads as one of the "three golden shoemakers of the island of Britain"); and bags of money. He is often armed with a spear. He is frequently accompanied by his consort Rosmerta ("great provider"), who bears the ritual drink with which kingship was conferred (in Roman mythology). Unlike the Roman Mercury, who is typically a youth, Gaulish Mercury is occasionally also represented as an old man. It has also been speculated that the Irish Leprechaun shares the same root "Lu" prechaun and notably leprechauns were also often represented as shoemakers.

Triplism

Gaulish Mercury is associated with triplism: sometimes he has three faces, sometimes three phalluses, which may explain the plural dedications. This also compares with Irish myth. In some versions of the story Lug was born as one of triplets, and his father, Cian ("Distance"), is often mentioned in the same breath as his brothers Cú ("Hound") and Cethen (meaning unknown), who nonetheless have no stories of their own. Several characters called Lugaid, a popular medieval Irish name thought to derive from Lug, also exhibit triplism: for example, Lugaid Riab nDerg ("of the Red Stripes") and Lugaid mac Trí Con ("Son of Three Hounds") both have three fathers.

Ludwig Rübekeil suggests that Lugus was a triune god, comprising Esus, Toutatis and Taranis, the three chief deities mentioned by Lucan (who, at the same time, makes no mention of Lugus), and that pre-Proto-Germanic tribes in contact with the Celts (possibly the Chatti) moulded aspects of Lugus into the Germanic god Wōdanaz i.e. that Gaulish Mercury gave rise to Germanic Mercury.

Sacred sites
High places (Mercurii Montes), including Montmartre, the Puy-de-Dôme and the Mont de Sène, were dedicated to him.

Continuity in later Celtic narratives
In Ireland, Lugh was the victorious youth who defeats the monstrous Balor "of the venomous eye". He was the godly paradigm of priestly kingship, and another of his appellations, lámhfhada “of the long arm”, carries on an ancient Proto-Indo-European image of a noble sovereign expanding his power far and wide. His festival, called Lughnasadh ("Festival of Lugh") in Ireland, was commemorated on 1 August. His name survives in the village of Louth (anciently Lughmhagh, "Lug's plain") and the County Louth in which it stands. When the Emperor Augustus inaugurated Lugdunum ("fort of Lugus", now Lyon) as the capital of Roman Gaul in 18 BC, he did so with a ceremony on 1 August (this may be coincidental, however, as this date also commemorates Augustus' victory over Cleopatra at Alexandria). At least two of the ancient Lughnasadh locations, Carmun and Tailtiu, were supposed to enclose the graves of goddesses linked with terrestrial fertility.

Lugus has also been suggested as the origin not only of Lugh and Lleu Llaw Gyffes, but also the Arthurian characters Lancelot and Lot (most famously championed by the Arthurian scholar Roger Sherman Loomis), though more recent Arthurian scholarship has downplayed any such link between Lugus and Lancelot.

See also
 Triple deities
 Llywelyn (name)

Notes

Bibliography

Further reading

Epigraphic evidence
 AE = L'Année épigraphique
 CIL = Corpus Inscriptionum Latinarum, Vol XIII: Inscriptiones trium Galliarum et Germaniarum Latinae; Vol II: Inscriptiones Hispaniae Latinae.
 ILER = Inscripciones Latinas de la España Romana
 IRPL = Inscriptions Romaines de la Province de Lugo
 Recueil des Inscriptions Gauloises [RIG], Tome 1: Textes gallo-grecs (CNRS, Paris, 1985)

Studies
 
 
 Ellis, Peter Berresford, Dictionary of Celtic Mythology (Oxford Paperback Reference), Oxford University Press, (1994): 
 
 
 
 
 . Accessed 18 Dec. 2022.
 
 
 Tovar, Antonio. "El dios céltico Lugu en España". In: La religión romana en Hispania. Madrid, Ministerio de Educación Nacional, 1981. pp. 279-282.

External links

Celtic gods
Commerce gods
Crafts gods
Mercurian deities
Triple gods